The 1999 Eurotel Slovak Open singles was the tennis singles event of the first edition of the most prestigious tournament in Slovakia. In a final of two future World No. 1s, Amélie Mauresmo defeated Kim Clijsters in straight sets, 6–3, 6–3.

Seeds

Draw

Finals

Top half

Bottom half

Qualifying

Seeds

Qualifiers

Qualifying draw

First qualifier

Second qualifier

Third qualifier

Fourth qualifier

References
 ITF singles results page

Eurotel Slovak Open - Singles